The Greater Ft. Myers Classic was a golf tournament on the LPGA Tour from 1974 to 1975. It was played at the Lochmoor Country Club in North Fort Myers, Florida.

In 1974, it was played as the Bill Branch LPGA Classic. Left-handed golfer Bonnie Bryant won the event by three strokes over Maria Astrologes, Jane Blalock, Shelley Hamlin, and Hollis Stacy. 

In 1975, it was played as the Greater Ft. Myers Classic. Sandra Haynie won the event on the second hole of a sudden-death playoff with Pat Bradley.

Winners
Greater Ft. Myers Classic
1975 Sandra Haynie

Bill Branch LPGA Classic
1974 Bonnie Bryant

References

Former LPGA Tour events
Golf in Florida
1974 establishments in Florida
1975 disestablishments in Florida
Recurring sporting events established in 1974
Recurring sporting events disestablished in 1975
Women's sports in Florida